AUX 88 is an electro group from Michigan, United States. AUX 88 is composed of Tom Tom (Tommy Hamilton) and Keith Tucker (DJ name DJ K1.) and BJ - William (POSATRONIX) Smith (BJ)and Anthony Horton (Blak Tony). The group was originally formed as "RX-7" in 1985. The group also formed another project known as Sight Beyond Sight, before forming AUX 88 in 1993. In 1995, Tucker went solo and Hamilton continued as Aux 88 together with dancer William "BJ" Smith. After Smith left, Aux 88 became Hamilton's solo project. Keith Tucker and BJ Smith later rejoined the band. The band now has only two members: Tommy Hamilton and William Bj Smith (TOMTOM AND POSATRONIX)

Aux 88 have released a string of singles, primarily on 430 West and Direct Beat Records. Their debut album Bass Magnetic  came out in 1993 and was followed by Is It Man or Machine? in 1996, followed by Hamilton's solo project, Xeo-Genetic (1998), which won for Detroit Music Awards' Best Artist and Best Recording. In 1999 Aux 8 released a CD in the Electro Boogie series of mixed albums. In 2005 Aux 88 released their self-titled third album Aux 88. Aux 88 have also released music under the aliases Aux Men and Alien FM.

AUX88 is now moving into the next chapter of their journey. They have launched their New Record Label imprint appropriately called "ELECTROSTATIC". The Future is near.

Discography
 1993: Bass Magnetic
 1996: Is It Man or Machine?
 1998: Reprogramming The Machine
 1998: Xeo-Genetic
 2005: AUX 88
 2009: Mad Scientist
 2010: Aux 88 Presents Black Tokyo
 2020: Counterparts

References

External links
 Discography

American electro musicians
American electronic musicians
Artists from Michigan